The End and Other Beginnings is a collection of science fiction short stories for young adults by Veronica Roth. The short stories include a tale of friendship and revenge, plus two of the stories are new additions to the Carve the Mark universe.

Contents
The six stories are:
 Inertia
 The Spinners
 Hearken Previously published
 Vim and Vigor
 Armored Ones Set in the Carve the Mark universe
 The Transformationist Set in the Carve the Mark universe on a new planet with new characters.

Development of the book
On October 4, 2018 HarperCollins announced a two-book deal with Roth.

In an interview Roth talked about how her writing has changed. "my process is different now, because I’m learning from each book. I do a lot more planning now, a lot more outlining, a lot more research. I know what questions to ask myself before I start. That’s the thing about writing—you can learn a lot from reading, a lot from critique, but you learn the most from actually doing it.”

Reception
One reviewer stated "Though they’re all worlds that feel ripe for more storytelling and diving into, each novella has a complete arc."

References

2019 short story collections
Science fiction short story collections
American short story collections
Young adult short story collections
HarperCollins books